

This is a list of the National Register of Historic Places listings in Hand County, South Dakota.

This is intended to be a complete list of the properties on the National Register of Historic Places in Hand County, South Dakota, United States. The locations of National Register properties for which the latitude and longitude coordinates are included below, may be seen in a map.

There are 7 properties listed on the National Register in the county.

Current listings

|}

See also
 List of National Historic Landmarks in South Dakota
 National Register of Historic Places listings in South Dakota

References

 
Hand County
Buildings and structures in Hand County, South Dakota